Wei-Ming Ni (born 23 December 1950) is a Taiwanese mathematician at the University of Minnesota and the Chinese University of Hong Kong, and the former director of the Center for PDE at the East China Normal University. He works in the field of elliptic and parabolic partial differential equations. He did undergraduate work at National Taiwan University and obtained his Ph.D. at New York University, in 1979, under the supervision of Louis Nirenberg. He is an editor-in-chief of the Journal of Differential Equations, and was an ISI Highly Cited Researcher in 2002. As said by the journal Discrete and Continuous Dynamical Systems:

Major publications 
 Gidas, B.; Ni, Wei Ming; Nirenberg, L. Symmetry and related properties via the maximum principle. Comm. Math. Phys. 68 (1979), no. 3, 209–243.
Mathematical analysis and applications, Part A, pp. 369–402, Adv. in Math. Suppl. Stud., 7a, Academic Press, New York-London, 1981.
 Lin, C.-S.; Ni, W.-M.; Takagi, I. Large amplitude stationary solutions to a chemotaxis system. J. Differential Equations 72 (1988), no. 1, 1–27.
 Ni, Wei-Ming; Takagi, Izumi. On the shape of least-energy solutions to a semilinear Neumann problem. Comm. Pure Appl. Math. 44 (1991), no. 7, 819–851.
 Lou, Yuan; Ni, Wei-Ming. Diffusion, self-diffusion and cross-diffusion. J. Differential Equations 131 (1996), no. 1, 79–131.
 Ni, Wei-Ming. Diffusion, cross-diffusion, and their spike-layer steady states. Notices Amer. Math. Soc. 45 (1998), no. 1, 9–18.

References

External links 
 

Taiwanese expatriates in the United States
1950 births
Living people
Taiwanese 3D films
Academic staff of the Chinese University of Hong Kong
Taiwanese expatriates in Hong Kong
New York University alumni
National Taiwan University alumni
Academic journal editors
Taiwanese expatriates in China
Academic staff of the East China Normal University
Expatriate academics in the United States
20th-century Taiwanese mathematicians
21st-century Taiwanese mathematicians
PDE theorists